North Carolina Highway 182 (NC 182) is a primary state highway in the U.S. state of North Carolina. It serves to connect the towns of Polkville and Lawndale with the city of Lincolnton.

Route description

NC 182 is a two-lane rural highway that begins at NC 226 in Polkville and ends at NC 27 near Lincolnton. The  route is a mildly curvy road crossing the First Broad River in Lawndale. All of NC 182 is concurrent with North Carolina Bicycle Route 8.

History
NC 182 was established in 1952 as a renumbering of NC 180 between Polkville and Fallston and a new primary routing between Fallston and NC 7 near Lincolnton. The route has remained unchanged since inception.

Junction list

References

External links

NCRoads.com: N.C. 182

182
Transportation in Cleveland County, North Carolina
Transportation in Lincoln County, North Carolina